Dunbar's local songs and recitations 1874 (full title: “Dunbar's Local and other Songs, Recitations and Conundrums, A Local Tale, &c. Composed by the late William Dunbar, Wardley Colliery, who died February 23rd 1874, aged 21 years. Printed by Stevenson and Dryden, St Nicholas' Church Yard, Newcastle upon Tyne 1874”) is a chapbook of Geordie folk song consisting of over 40 pages, published in 1874, after the author's death.

The publication 
William Dunbar wrote all the songs and a set of the original documents are retained in the archives of Beamish Museum.

The front cover of the book was as thus :-

LOCAL AND OTHER<br/ >
SONGS, RECITATIONS, <br/ >
AND CONUNDRUMS, <br/ >
A<br/ >
Local Tale, &c<br/ >
COMPOSED BY THE LATE<br/ >
WILLIAM DUMBAR<br/ >
WARDLEY COLLIERY<br/ >
WHO DIED FEBRUARY 23RD 1874, AGED 21 YEARS<br/ >
<br/ >
NEWCASTLE-UPON-TYNE<br/ >
PRINTED BY STEVENSON AND DRYDEN, ST. NICHOLAS' CHURCH YARD<br/ >
<br/ >
1874

Contents 
In alphabetical order are as below :-<br/ >

See also 
Geordie dialect words
William Dunbar

References

External links
 FARNE – Folk Archive Resource North East – front cover
 Allan’s Illustrated Edition of Tyneside songs and readings

English folk songs
Songs related to Newcastle upon Tyne
Northumbrian folklore
1874 books
Chapbooks